Elizabeth Gaines is an Australian businessperson who serves as chief executive officer (CEO) of iron ore company Fortescue Metals Group. She is the company's first female CEO.

Education 
Gaines attended Perth Modern School. She graduated from Curtin University and received a Master's in Applied Finance from Macquarie University.

Career 
Gaines served as CEO of Heytesbury Pty. Ltd. from 1997 to 2005. She also served as CFO of Stella Group and Entertainment Rights.

In 2008, Gaines joined travel company Helloworld. She served as CFO of the company and became CEO in April 2014. In June 2015, she resigned as Helloworld's CEO.

Gaines joined the board of Fortescue Metals Group in 2013, while still CFO of Helloworld. She was the company's first female non-executive director. Gaines was appointed CEO of Fortescue in November 2017 succeeding Nev Power. Before becoming CEO, she served as the Fortescue's chief financial officer (CFO).

In December 2021, three years after becoming CEO of Fortescue, Gaines announced her future departure from the CEO role, intending remain with the company as a non-executive director on the board and as Fortescue's global green hydrogen ambassador. A global search is underway for her successor.

References 

Living people
Australian businesspeople
Year of birth missing (living people)
Australian women in business
Fortescue Metals Group